is a role-playing video game developed by K2 for the PlayStation Portable. It is the sequel to Valhalla Knights.

Plot 
Every 1000 years, the Goddess of Judgement punishes mankind for their ways. This time, however, a witch fought her but failed. In her attempt, the witch managed to destroy one of the Goddess' wings and thus forced the Goddess to hide and recover, as her feathers cursed the land with monsters. 1000 years after the battle, the cursed land is trying to hunt down the cause of the suffering and thus the hero/heroine's adventure begins.

Gameplay 
The player can explore its vast playable area and try to improve his/her battle party. The sequel adds new races, weapons, objectives and more. Multiplayer includes 6 vs. 6 battles and online Co-op and versus.

Reception 

The game received "mixed or average" reviews according to the review aggregation website Metacritic.

References

External links 

2008 video games
Marvelous Entertainment
Multiplayer and single-player video games
PlayStation Portable games
PlayStation Portable-only games
Role-playing video games
Video games developed in Japan
Video games featuring protagonists of selectable gender
Rising Star Games games
Xseed Games games